Wittlin is a surname. Notable people with the surname include:

Alma Wittlin (1899–1992), Austrian writer
Curt Wittlin (1941–2019), Swiss philologist
Józef Wittlin (1896–1976), Polish novelist, poet, and translator
 (1909–1998), Polish writer